Zingarevich is a Russian surname. Notable people with the surname include:

 Anton Zingarevich (born 1982), Russian businessman
 Mikhail Zingarevich (born 1959), Russian businessman

Russian-language surnames